Mabel Hamblen (19 September 1904 – 18 April 1955) was a British swimmer. She competed in the women's 200 metre breaststroke event at the 1928 Summer Olympics in Amsterdam. Hamblen was the first woman to win Long Distance Champion of England for three successive years (1926–1928), swimming five miles on the River Thames from Kew to Putney. She was a founding member of the Hammersmith Ladies Swimming Club, and once served as captain.

References

External links
 

1904 births
1955 deaths
British female swimmers
Olympic swimmers of Great Britain
Swimmers at the 1928 Summer Olympics
People from Fulham
Sportspeople from London
Female breaststroke swimmers
20th-century British women